Nathan Smith (born 17 July 1988) is an Australian professional rugby league footballer. He previously played for the Parramatta Eels of the National Rugby League.

Early life
Born in Bowraville, New South Wales, Smith played his junior football for the Bowraville Tigers before being signed by the Canterbury-Bankstown Bulldogs.

Rugby league career

2008-2010: Early playing career
He played for the Bulldogs' Toyota Cup team in 2008, playing 20 games before moving on to the Bulldogs' NSW Cup reserve-grade team in 2009.

2011: Move to Parramatta
At the end of 2011, Smith signed with the Parramatta Eels after a lack of first-grade opportunities at the Bulldogs.

2012: First-grade debut
In Round 18 of the 2012 NRL season he made his NRL debut for the Eels against the Manly-Warringah Sea Eagles after Parramatta hooker, Matt Keating was injured during the warm-up. Smith replaced Keating for the rest of the 2012 NRL season after Keating was ruled out for the rest of the year.

2013
In June 2013, Smith was one of 12 Parramatta players that were told that their futures at the club were uncertain by coach, Ricky Stuart.

References

External links
2012 Parramatta Eels profile

1988 births
Living people
Australian rugby league players
Parramatta Eels players
Rugby league hookers
Rugby league halfbacks
Rugby league players from New South Wales
Wentworthville Magpies players